In the Wake of Evolution is the tenth full-length album by progressive rock band Kaipa.

Track listing
 "In the Wake of Evolution" - 10:57
 "In the Heart of Her Own Magic Field" - 5:12
 "Electric Power Water Notes" - 17:51
 "Folkia's First Decision" - 2:33
 "The Words Are Like Leaves" - 5:36
 "Arcs of Sound" - 8:22
 "Smoke From a Secret Source" - 9:24
 "The Seven Oceans of Our Mind" - 10:08

Personnel
 Patrik Lundström - vocals
 Aleena Gibson - vocals
 Per Nilsson - electric and acoustic guitars
 Morgan Ågren - drums
 Hans Lundin - electric and acoustic keyboards, vocals
 Jonas Reingold - electric basses
 Fredrik Lindqvist - recorders (tracks 2,3, 4, 5, & 8)
 Elin Rubinsztein - violin (tracks 1, 4, 5, & 7)

2010 albums
Kaipa albums